Wolfgang of the Palatinate (nicknamed the Elder; 31 October 1494 in Heidelberg – 2 April 1558 in Neumarkt) was a German nobleman from the House of Wittelsbach.  He was Count Palatine of Neumarkt and governor of the Upper Palatinate.

Life 
Wolfgang was a son of the Elector Palatine Philip (1448-1508) from his marriage to Margaret (1456-1501), the daughter of Duke Louis IX of Bavaria-Landshut.  His parents intended Wolfgang to have a religious career.  He was a canon in Augsburg, Würzburg and Speyer, and from 1515 Rector Magnificus of the university of Wittenberg.  In 1524, Wolfgang returned to the lay state.

In 1522, Wolfgang became a member of the Teutonic Knights and in 1524, he received Neumarkt as an apanage.  In 1544, he was appointed governor of the Upper Palatinate at Amberg.  He was considered a friend and patron of the sciences.

Wolfgang died in 1558, unmarried and childless.  He was buried in the Church of the Holy Spirit in Heidelberg.

References 
 Michael Masson: Das Königshaus Bayern: genealogisch bearbeitet und mit historisch-biographischen Notizen erläutert, self-published, 1854, p. 102
 Bayerische numismatische Gesellschaft: Mitteilungen der Bayerischen numismatischen Gesellschaft, vols. 7–10, self-published, 1888, p. 149

German princes
Teutonic Knights
House of Palatinate-Neumarkt
Counts Palatine of the Holy Roman Empire
1494 births
1558 deaths
16th-century German people
Burials at the Church of the Holy Spirit, Heidelberg
Sons of monarchs